Additional rent is a term used in commercial real estate to describe a variety of rent-like cash flows from tenants that are not part of the traditional base rent. In retail settings, especially shopping malls, these often include percentage rent and various recoverable expenses.

Additional rent items are used in almost all commercial leases to deal with costs that are shared by multiple tenants. For instance, in a shopping mall the cost of cleaning the common areas, paying real estate taxes or repaving the parking lot is normally shared among all of the tenants. The total cost is generally divided out based on the individual tenant's "proportionate share", typically calculated by dividing the tenant's leased square footage by the total area of the building. Sub-areas are also common for handling costs shared among a sub-group of tenants, like cleaning a food court which is generally more expensive and shared among a smaller group.

References
 

Commercial real estate